Pen Twyn Mawr is a top of Pen y Gadair Fawr in the Black Mountains in south-eastern Wales. It lies on one of the many south ridges of Waun Fach.
 
The summit is marked by a pile of stones in an area of sandy soil and heather. Pen y Gadair Fawr is to the north, Chwarel y Fan to the east and Pen Allt-mawr to the west.

References

External links
 www.geograph.co.uk : photos of Waun Fach and surrounding area

Nuttalls
Mountains and hills of Powys
Black Mountains, Wales